was a renowned Japanese photographer.

References

Japanese photographers
1916 births
2005 deaths